Anaproutia is a genus of moths belonging to the family Psychidae.

The species of this genus are found in Europe.

Species:
 Anaproutia comitella (Bruand, 1853) 
 Anaproutia norvegica (Schoyen, 1880)

References

Psychidae
Psychidae genera